Air Marshal Younes Hamed Al-Masri (born 15 August 1959) is the Minister of Civil Aviation, and was the Commander of the Egyptian Air Force from 2012 until 2018.

Hamed graduated from the Egyptian Air Academy on 16 December 1979.  During his service in the Egyptian Air Force he was the commander of a flying squadron, an air brigade commander and an air area commander.  

He was appointed to the post by President Mohamed Morsi on 14 August 2012, succeeding Reda Mahmoud Hafez Mohamed. He is a member of the Supreme Council of the Armed Forces, which was reorganized in September 2012.  On 4 November 2013 he was promoted to the rank of air marshal. In 2015, he met with US Lieutenant General Charles Q. Brown Jr. to discuss military cooperation between Egypt and the United States.  On 14 June 2018, he was appointed as the new Minister of Civil Aviation in Prime Minister Mostafa Madbouly's new cabinet.

Military education

 Bachelor of aviation and military sciences 
 Destructive capabilities' Course 
 M.A. of military sciences from the Egyptian Command and Staff College 
 War Course, Fellowship of the Higher War College, Nasser's Military Sciences Academy 
 Crisis Management, Nasser's Military Sciences Academy

Decorations and Medals

 Longevity and Exemplary Medal 
 Military Duty Decoration, Second Class 
 Military Duty Decoration, First Class 
 Distinguished Service Decoration 
 25 January Revolution Medal

References

|-

|-

Living people
Members of the Supreme Council of the Armed Forces
Egyptian Air Academy alumni
Egyptian Air Force air marshals
1959 births
People from Sohag Governorate
Civil Aviation ministers of Egypt